Herbert Charles Mellows (29 March 1896 – 25 February 1942) was an Irish Sinn Féin politician, and the brother of Liam Mellows. He was Director of Finance and commander of the 2nd Company in Dolphins Barn in the organisation, Fianna Éireann from August 1915 until the Easter Rising in 1916. From January 1917 to June 1917 he became Adjutant general of the organization.

He was elected at the 1923 general election as Teachta Dála (TD) for the Galway constituency, but in accordance with Sinn Féin's abstentionist policy, he did not take his seat. He lost his seat at the June 1927 general election, and did not stand again.

References

External links
1901 census return
1911 census return

1896 births
1942 deaths
Members of the 4th Dáil
Politicians from County Galway
Early Sinn Féin TDs